Brickellia monocephala is a North American species of flowering plants in the family Asteraceae. It is widespread across much of Mexico  from Hidalgo and Durango south as far as Oaxaca. The species is unusual in the genus in having only one relatively large flower head per stalk rather than several small ones.

References

External links
Photo of herbarium specimen at Missouri Botanical Garden, collected in Hidalgo, isotype of Brickellia monocephala

monocephala
Flora of Mexico
Plants described in 1904